There's No Sympathy for the Dead is the debut EP by American rock band Escape the Fate, released in 2006. It is the band's debut release after signing with Epitaph Records. Two songs from the EP titled "There's No Sympathy for the Dead" and "The Guillotine" would later be featured in the band's debut studio album Dying Is Your Latest Fashion.

Track listing

Personnel
Escape the Fate
 Ronnie Radke – lead vocals, acoustic guitar
 Bryan "Monte" Money – guitars, backing vocals
 Omar Espinosa - guitars, backing vocals
 Max Green – bass guitar, backing vocals
 Carson Allen - keyboards, synthesisers, piano, programming, backing vocals
 Robert Ortiz – drums, percussion

 Additional musicians
 Karen Schielke - programming, synthesizers
 Jeff Moll - programming
 Dave Holdredge - cello

Production
Michael "Elvis" Baskette - production, mixing
Josh Whelan - production
Lynn Lauer - engineering, mixing
Karen Schielke - engineering
Carson Allen - composer on "As You're Falling Down" and "There's No Sympathy for the Dead"

Usage in media
"As You're Falling Down" is in the soundtrack of Arena Football: Road to Glory.

References

2006 debut EPs
Escape the Fate albums
Epitaph Records EPs
Albums produced by Michael Baskette
Post-hardcore EPs
Emo EPs
Metalcore EPs